The Naples Cathedral, or Cathedral of the Assumption of Mary, is a Roman Catholic cathedral, the main church of Naples, southern Italy, and the seat of the Archbishop of Naples. It is widely known as the Cattedrale di San Gennaro (Cathedral of Saint Januarius), in honour of the city's patron saint.

History

The present cathedral in Angevin gothic style was commissioned by King Charles I of Anjou. Construction continued during the reign of his successor, Charles II (1285–1309) and was completed in the early 14th century under Robert of Anjou. It was built on the foundations of two palaeo-Christian basilicas, whose traces can still be clearly seen. Underneath the building excavations have revealed Greek and Roman artifacts.

The Archbishop's Palace adjoins the cathedral.

Interior and artwork

The cathedral gives access to the archaeological remains in the crypt of the neighbouring original palaeochristian church of Santa Restituta where there is a Greek wall belonging to the temple of Apollo, in opus reticulatum. Under the apse the peristyle of a late imperial domus can be seen; also a stretch of Roman aqueduct after the foundation of the city and a stretch of Greek road on an inclined plane.

Another attraction of the interior is the Royal Chapel of the Treasure of San Gennaro, with frescoes by Domenichino and Giovanni Lanfranco, altarpieces by Domenichino, Massimo Stanzione and Jusepe Ribera, the rich high altar by Francesco Solimena, the bronze railing by Cosimo Fanzago and other artworks, including a reliquary by French masters of the 14th century.

Other artworks include an Assumption by Pietro Perugino, canvasses by Luca Giordano and the palaeo-Christian baptistery, with mosaics from the 4th century. The main chapel is a restoration of the 18th century, with a Baroque relief by Pietro Bracci. The Minutolo Chapel, mentioned in Boccaccio's Decameron, has 14th-century frescoes.

The crypt is by the Lombard Tommaso Malvito. The façade was reworked by Enrico Alvino in the late 19th century, but retains the 15th century portal, including some sculptures by Tino da Camaino.

Miracle of the Blood

The church houses a vial of the blood of Saint Januarius, which is brought out three times a year, on the first Saturday in May, on 19 September and 16 December, when the dried blood usually liquefies. If the blood fails to liquefy, then legend has it that disaster will befall Naples.

A recent hypothesis by Garlaschelli, Ramaccini, and Della Sala is that the vial contains a thixotropic gel, he also explained on the Blood Miracle of Riddles of the Dead series on National Geographic Channel. In such a substance viscosity increases if left unstirred and decreases if stirred or moved. Researchers have proposed specifically a suspension of hydrated iron oxide, FeO(OH), which reproduces the color and behavior of the 'blood' in the ampoule. The suspension can be prepared from simple chemicals that would have been easily available locally since antiquity.
On March 21, 2015, the blood in the vial appeared to liquify during a visit by Pope Francis. This was taken as a sign of the saint's favour of the pope. The blood did not liquify when Pope Benedict XVI visited in 2007.

Burials

 Saint Januarius
 Pope Innocent IV
 Charles I of Naples
 Saint Restituta
 Sisto Riario Sforza
 Rinaldo Piscicello
 Ascanio Filomarino
 Alfonso Castaldo

References

14th-century Roman Catholic church buildings in Italy
Gennaro
Burial places of popes
Gothic architecture in Naples
Roman Catholic cathedrals in Italy
Cathedrals in Campania
Burial sites of the Capetian House of Anjou